Santram Mandir is a Hindu temple situated in Nadiad, Gujarat, India. It is run by the Santram Maharaj organization which draws from a Hindu religious figure in Gujarat. The Santram mandir runs trusts for humanitarian activities like Eye Hospital, Physiotherapy Center, Dispensary, Radiology Center, Pathology & Laboratory as well as various other services which is countless. It also carries out various cultural as well as social activities.
There are other "Santram Mandir" located in Vadodara, Karamsad, Padra, Koyli, Umreth, Radhu, Kalser, Pachegaam, Chaklasi, Sojitra & Varad. And several other places has its Paaduka like Raniya, Narsanda, Sarsavni, Salun, Piplag, Alindra and many more places.

Many people offer fast on Thursdays, Purnima & Ekadashi in reverence to Santram Maharaj. Few years ago the Santram mandir was made of wood but endowments in the form of donation that received large amount have transformed it. There is done beautiful decoration by them it look wonderful in some special days like sakar varsha, dev diwali etc. Beautiful rangoli are also done. On devdiwali the temple is decorated with lamps.

History

The original Santram Maharaj was a Saint of the Avadhoot category. He came to Nadiad from Girnar, so he was also called Girnari Bava, Videhi Bava, or Sukha-Sagarji. He came here in Samvat 1872, lived for the spiritual good of People for the 15 years, and took Jivat-Samadhi on the full-moon-day of the month Magha of Samvat 1887.

The present Mahant of the Nadiad temple, Shree Ramdasji is the ninth Mahant on the Gadi of the temple. The details are as follows:

 Shree Santram Maharaj: His Samadhi-date was the full-moon-day of Magha of Samvat 1887.
 Shree Laxmandasji Maharaj: His Samadhi-date was the 14th day of the dark-half of Vaishakh of Samvat 1925.
 Shree Chaturdas Maharaj: His Samadhi-date was the 9th of the bright-half of Asho (Ashvin-month) of Samvat 1941.
 Shree Jayaramdas Maharaj: (1941 to 1947): His Samadhi-date was the 11th day of the bright half of Jyestha of Samvat 1947.
 Shree Mugutram Maharaj: (1947 to 1961), His Samadhi-date was the 8th day of the bright-half of Sharavan of Samvat 1961.
 Shree Manekdas Maharaj: (1961 to 1973), His Samadhi-date was 11th day of the bright half of Vaishakh of Samvat 1973.
 Shree Jankidas Maharaj: (1973 to 2026), His Samadhi-date was the 8th day of the bright half of Vaishakh of Samvat 2026.
 Shree Narayandas Maharaj: (2023 to 2060)Sat on Gadi of the temple on 7 June 1967 (Samvat 2023).
 Shree Ramdas Maharaj: 2060 till today.

Shree Jankidas Maharaj occupied the Gadi for 53 years and he was very practical. He could see through a man as soon as he came near him. The temple's expansion became very big during his period. It became known throughout India. He did many things for the good for the temple:

 In Samvat 2007, he obtained a primary school building for Boys constructed at the cost of Rs. 1,16,101 and hand it over to the  Nadiad Municipality.
 In Samvat 2017, he built the Santram Kanyashala (Girls' School), constructed at the cost of Rs. 70,087.
 Before that in Samvat 2000, he purchased the Atithi-Nivas at the price of Rs. 84,709 and put it at the Service of the people.
 In Samvat 2000, he got constructed the building Arogya-Bhavan at the cost of Rs. 50,668 and put it at the service of the people.
 In Samvat 2010, he got constructed the shed of Yoga-Khand at the cost of Rs. 82,683.
 In Samvat 2024, he got constructed the Hostel for Boys at the cost of Rs. 80,000. At present 150 pupils are reside in it.
 In Samvat 2025, he got constructed the building of the Eye-Hospital and handed it over to the Sad-Vichar-Samitee.
 In Samvat 2028, Shree Narayandas Maharaj constructed the building of Satsang-Bhavan, two meditation-halls, and 6 flats for the Saints, who come to deliver religious discourses, at the cost of one lakh rupees. Religious discourses are given, all the year round, by learned Saints. Hundreds of people come to hear them every evening and to take benefit of their holy company every day.  In the morning and evening, hundreds of poor people are fed in the temple. Shree Narayandas, followed in the foot steps of  Shree Jankidasji Maharaj, by constantly did work to alleviate hunger. The motto of the Maharaj is "Service of People is worship of God".

External links
Official website
Photo gallery
Audio Bhajans

Hindu temples in Gujarat
Vishnu temples
Tourist attractions in Kheda district